Sword and shield are a bladed weapon and a piece of personal armour, respectively.

Sword and shield may also refer to:

Fencing with sword and shield
Viking Age arms and armour
Sword and Shield, a Dungeons & Dragons adventure module
Sword and Shield (film), a 1926 German silent film
The Shield and the Sword, a song by Clare Maguire
The Shield and the Sword (film), a 1968 Soviet spy series
Pokémon Sword and Shield, 2019 games in the Pokémon video game series
The emblem of the KGB (Soviet intelligence agency), and also its successor, Federal Security Service of the Russian Federation
Royal Armouries Ms. I.33
Society for Creative Anachronism
The US-Japanese alliance

See also 
Sword (disambiguation)
Shield (disambiguation)